Svetlana Antipova (née Zaboluyeva, born 20 August 1966) is a Russian former basketball player who competed in the 1992 Summer Olympics and in the 1996 Summer Olympics.

References

1966 births
Living people
Russian women's basketball players
Olympic basketball players of the Unified Team
Olympic basketball players of Russia
Basketball players at the 1992 Summer Olympics
Basketball players at the 1996 Summer Olympics
Olympic gold medalists for the Unified Team
Olympic medalists in basketball
Soviet women's basketball players
Medalists at the 1992 Summer Olympics